Aleksandr Svyatoslavovich Riabushenko (born 12 October 1995) is a Belarusian cyclist, who currently rides for UCI WorldTeam . In October 2020, he was named in the startlist for the 2020 Vuelta a España.

Personal life
His father, Svyatoslav Ryabushenko, also competed professionally as a cyclist.

Major results

2013
 1st Stage 3 Giro di Basilicata
 2nd Overall Le Trophée Centre Morbihan
1st  Mountains classification
 2nd Trofeo Buffoni
 7th Road race, UEC European Junior Road Championships
2014
 3rd Time trial, National Under-23 Road Championships
 7th Trofeo Città di San Vendemiano
 9th Moscow Cup
2015
 2nd Road race, National Under-23 Road Championships
 10th Gran Premio della Liberazione
2016
 1st  Road race, UEC European Under-23 Road Championships
 3rd GP Capodarco
 4th Road race, National Road Championships
 4th Gran Premio di Poggiana
 7th Ruota d'Oro
2017
 1st Giro del Belvedere
 1st Piccolo Giro di Lombardia
 1st Stage 2 Giro Ciclistico d'Italia
 2nd Trofeo Alcide Degasperi
 3rd Road race, National Road Championships
 3rd Trofeo Banca Popolare di Vicenza
 3rd Trofeo Edil C
 3rd Gran Premio della Liberazione
 8th Overall Toscana-Terra di Ciclismo
1st Points classification
1st Stage 1b
 10th Gran Premio di Poggiana
2019
 1st Coppa Ugo Agostoni
 2nd Gran Premio di Lugano
 4th Road race, European Games
 10th Overall Okolo Slovenska
2020 
 2nd Road race, National Road Championships
 3rd Memorial Marco Pantani
 3rd Coppa Sabatini

Grand Tour general classification results timeline

References

External links

1995 births
Living people
Belarusian male cyclists
European Games competitors for Belarus
Cyclists at the 2019 European Games
Olympic cyclists of Belarus
Cyclists at the 2020 Summer Olympics
Cyclists from Minsk